is a Japanese professional footballer who plays as a winger for J1 League club Gamba Osaka.

National team career
In June 2011, Ishige was elected Japan U-17 national team for 2011 U-17 World Cup and he played 4 matches and scored 3 goals.

Career statistics

Honours

Individual
Asian Young Footballer of the Year (1) : 2011
J. League Cup New Hero Award (1) : 2012

References

External links

Profile at Gamba Osaka

1994 births
Living people
Association football people from Shizuoka Prefecture
Japanese footballers
Japan youth international footballers
J1 League players
J2 League players
J3 League players
Shimizu S-Pulse players
J.League U-22 Selection players
Fagiano Okayama players
Gamba Osaka players
Asian Young Footballer of the Year winners
Association football midfielders